Saint-Paul-Saint-Antoine is a former railway station in Saint-Paul-de-Jarrat, Occitanie, France.

History

The station is on the Toulouse–La Tour-de-Carol railway line. The station is served by TER (local) bus services operated by the SNCF.

Bus services

Bus services depart from Saint-Paul-Saint-Antoine towards Ax-les-Thermes, Luzenac, Les Cabannes (Town Centre), Tarascon-sur-Ariège, Ussat-les-Bains, Mercus-Garrabet, Montgaillard, Foix, Saint-Jean-de-Verges, Varilhes and Pamiers.

References

External links
Toulouse-Latour-de-Carol timetable 

Railway stations in France opened in 1888
Defunct railway stations in Ariège (department)